The 1950 Oregon gubernatorial election took place on November 7, 1950 to elect the governor of the U.S. state of Oregon. Incumbent Republican governor Douglas McKay defeated Democratic nominee Austin F. Flegel.

Background
McKay had been elected in a 1948 gubernatorial special election to replace interim governor John Hubert Hall. Hall, as Speaker of the Oregon House of Representatives, had succeeded to the governorship following the death of governor Earl Snell, Oregon Secretary of State Robert S. Farrell, Jr., and State Senate President Marshall E. Cornett in a plane crash on October 30, 1947.

Campaign
In his reelection bid, McKay was unopposed in the Republican primary. In the Democratic primary, Portland attorney and state senator Austin F. Flegel defeated Oregon State Treasurer Walter J. Pearson and former state senator and 1942 and 1948 Democratic gubernatorial nominee Lew Wallace.  In the general election, McKay defeated Flegel by a nearly 2–1 margin.

McKay would step down less than two years into his term to become United States Secretary of the Interior under President Dwight Eisenhower.

Election results

References

1950
Gubernatorial
Oregon
November 1950 events in the United States